Palem  is a village and Gram panchayat of Anumula mandal, Nalgonda district, in Telangana state in India.

Several villages also have Palem as the second part of their name, including Pagadam Vari Palem, Kotireddy Palem, Tummala Palem and Rambhatla palem.

References

Villages in Nalgonda district